Green Light is a studio album by Cliff Richard, released in September 1978. It was his 21st studio album.

Background 

Cliff Richard had seen a dip in popularity in the early 1970s until his 1976 album I'm Nearly Famous gave him major success. This comeback kept Richard regularly in the charts until the mid-1980s. Of the albums released during this period, only the 1978 Small Corners gospel album and Green Light failed to make the top 10. The latter, with full commercial expectations proved to be a particular disappointment, only reaching No.25 in the album charts and failing to provide any high charting singles. The lead single, "Please Remember Me" failed to chart at all, as did the follow-up, "Can't Take the Hurt Anymore". This left Richard without a hit single in 1978, only the second year since 1958 that this had happened. A third and final release, the title track "Green Light" finally gave him a chart entry in early 1979, but only managed to creep up to No.57.
Despite the album's lack of commercial success, Green Light was well received by critics. Allmusic stating that this was "Richard at his most commercial and appealing and deserved to be more widely heard - particularly in the US". Probably the most well-known song on the album however was "Count Me Out", which was later released as the B-side to Richard's 1979 single "We Don't Talk Anymore", which was the song that got his revival back on track by becoming the biggest selling single of his career. Another ballad, the striking "Never Even Thought" with intense lyrics and heavy orchestration building to a dramatic crescendo, was first released by Murray Head in 1975 on his album Say It Ain't So and also covered by Colin Blunstone in 1978. Richard later remixed his original version of the track and added new instrumentation for his remix album My Kinda Life in 1992.

Since his 1977 Every Face Tells a Story album, Richard had released two other albums - a Christian music album, Small Corners and a compilation album 40 Golden Greats, which had reached No.1 in November 1977. Soon after this, he also released a live album, Thank You Very Much, which celebrated 20 years of Cliff Richard and The Shadows in the music business.

The title track was covered in 1979 by Yvonne Elliman on her album Yvonne.

Green Light was remastered and re-issued on Compact disc in July 2002.

Track listing

Personnel
Cliff Richard - vocals
Alan Tarney - guitar, bass, keyboards, backing vocals
Alan Parker, Terry Britten, Tim Renwick - guitar
Alan Jones - bass
Duncan Mackay, Graham Todd - keyboards
Brian Bennett, Trevor Spencer - drums
John Perry, Stuart Calver, Tony Rivers - backing vocals
Richard Hewson - string arrangement
Gered Mankowitz - photography

Chart history

References

External links 

Cliff Richard albums
1978 albums
EMI Records albums